Flavorwire is a New York City-based online culture magazine. The site includes original feature articles, interviews, reviews, as well as content recycled from other sources. Flavorwire describes themselves as "a network of culturally connected people, covering events, art, books, music, film, TV, and pop culture the world over. Highbrow, lowbrow, and everything in between: if it’s compelling we’re talking about it." Flavorwire was created by Flavorpill Media.

History
According to Flavorwire editorial director Elizabeth Spiers, Flavorwire "was originally designed to complement Flavorpill's events business and event-driven email newsletters. For a long time, it had no real web publication." In 2014 Flavorpill began to grow and add more original content. In 2018, Flavorpill was acquired by Bustle Digital Group.

References

External links
 Flavorwire
 Flavorpill Media

Online music magazines published in the United States
Cultural magazines published in the United States
Music review websites
Magazines with year of establishment missing
Magazines published in New York City
2018 mergers and acquisitions